Appias lasti, the Last's albatross or Last's albatross white, is a butterfly in the family Pieridae. It is found in Kenya, Tanzania and Mozambique. The habitat consists of coastal forests and heavy woodland.

Adults have a weak flight and keep to forest edges or clearings. Both sexes are attracted to flowers and males come to damp patches.

The larvae feed on Drypetes gerrardii, Phyllanthus, Capparis, Maerua, and Ritchiea species.

Subspecies
Appias lasti lasti (coast of Kenya, coast of Tanzania and coast of Mozambique)
Appias lasti natalensis Neustetter, 1927 (South Africa: Natal, but this is thought to be a false locality)

References

External links
Seitz, A. Die Gross-Schmetterlinge der Erde 13: Die Afrikanischen Tagfalter. Plate XIII 11

Butterflies described in 1889
Appias (butterfly)
Butterflies of Africa
Taxa named by Henley Grose-Smith